The 2020 Sri Lankan blackouts were a series of electrical blackouts that occurred on 17 August 2020, beginning around 12.30 pm SLST (UTC+5:30) and lasting over seven hours. The nationwide blackouts occurred due to a transmission technical failure at the Kerawalapitiya Grid-Sub station. The Ceylon Electricity Board announced that the cause of the blackout had not yet been determined, describing it as an unspecified failure. The Ministry of Power stated that a special committee had been appointed to investigate the root cause behind the blackout.

Development 
The outage caused disruption in day-to-day activities of the public, including causing traffic congestion in Colombo due to malfunctioning of traffic signals and malfunctioning water supply services. Power was restored to the south of the island relatively early, due to it being powered by the Samanala Dam.

Initially, a spokesperson of the Ministry of Power claimed that the outage occurred due to a failure in the Yugadanavi Power Plant. The Minister of Power Dullas Alahapperuma later stated that the outage would be resolved within a space of two hours but the restoration process was delayed for hours due to cascading failures. The power was restored in most parts of the country including Colombo at around 8.30 pm and was regarded as the worst nationwide blackout faced by the country since 2016. The blackout further aggravated the impact of the COVID-19 pandemic in the country. The blackout did not disrupt Bandaranaike International Airport, the main airport of the country, which was closed for months due to the COVID-19 pandemic. Hospitals, offices and other infrastructure had backup power generators.

Background 
Sri Lanka's electricity demand is currently met by thermal power stations (54.59%), major hydroelectric power stations (33.50%), and wind farms (2.12%), small hydro facilities (8.01%) and other renewables such as solar (1.78%). Sri Lanka as a whole faced major nationwide blackout during March 2016 which lasted for over eight hours. Localised regional power cuts are common in Sri Lanka although nationwide blackouts are rare.

See also

 2019 Sri Lanka electricity crisis

References

Blackouts
August 2020 events in Asia
2020 blackouts
Power outages
Blackouts